Waiting for a Miracle is a 2007 Russian romantic comedy-drama film directed by Yevgeny Bedarev.

Plot 
The film tells about a young girl Maya who is unlucky in her personal life and at work, but despite this she continues to believe that miracles do happen and she will meet love. And now the dream begins to come true.

Cast 
 Yekaterina Kopanova as Maya
 Vladimir Krylov as  Fairy Paphnutius
 Grigory Antipenko as a passenger on an airplane
 Tatyana Vasilyeva as Renata Genrikhovna
 Nina Ruslanova as Valentina Petrovna
 Olesya Sudzilovskaya as Kate
 Mariya Aronova as seller of happiness
 Lev Durov as  judge
 Sergey Zverev as cameo	
 Stanislav Bondarenko as Marat
 Vladimir Dolinskiy as Advocate
 Artyom Tkachenko as passer-by
 Vladimir Epifantsev as trainer in a fitness club

References

External links 
 
 История по моде сезона.  Review of the Iskusstvo Kino
 Рецензия на фильм «В ожидании чуда».    Valery Kichin's Review
2007 films
2000s Russian-language films
2007 romantic comedy-drama films
2000s fantasy comedy-drama films
Russian romantic comedy-drama films
Russian fantasy comedy-drama films
20th Century Fox films